Euseius neofustis is a species of mite in the family Phytoseiidae.

References

neofustis
Articles created by Qbugbot
Animals described in 1988